List of miscellaneous ships of the Royal Fleet Auxiliary is a list of miscellaneous vessel types operated by the British Royal Fleet Auxiliary.

Active
Helicopter Support Ship

Decommissioned
Forward Repair Ship

Helicopter Support Ships

Salvage Vessels
King Salvor class

Hospital Ships

Notes and references

United Kingdom
Miscellaneous
Miscellaneous